Nicholas Westwood Kidd better known by his stage name Kidd (sometimes stylized as KIDD) (b. 31 March 1989) is a Danish rapper and hip hop artist, with Indian and Scottish origin. After gaining attention online, he founded CHEFF Records. He was nominated for "Best Newcomer" in 2011 and performed during 2011 Danish Music Awards.

Discography

Albums

EPs
2011: Mine venner snakker (EP)

Singles

Featured in

Videography
2011: "Kysset med Jamel"
2011: "Ik lavet penge"

References

Danish rappers
1989 births
Living people